Railway Mixed High School (English Medium) Podanur, is an Anglo-Indian syllabus school but now CBSE syllabus situated in Podanur, Coimbatore district, Tamil Nadu, India. This is the oldest school in Podanur town.
The main building was built by British. This school is more than 128 years old.
School celebrate 128th Annual Day function in 24 February 2017.

Railway schools in India
High schools and secondary schools in Tamil Nadu
Schools in Coimbatore